The 2013 Algerian Super Cup is the  7th edition of Algerian Super Cup, a football match contested by the winners of the Ligue 1 and 2012–13 Algerian Cup competitions. The match was scheduled to be played on 11 January 2014 at Stade Mustapha Tchaker in Blida between 2013-14 Ligue 1 winners ES Sétif and 2012–13 Algerian Cup winners USM Alger.

Match details

See also
 2012–13 Algerian Ligue Professionnelle 1
 2012–13 Algerian Cup

References 

2013
Supercup
USM Alger matches
ES Sétif matches